Evandra is a genus of flowering plants belonging to the family Cyperaceae.

Its native range is Southwestern Australia.

Species:

Evandra aristata 
Evandra pauciflora

References

Cyperaceae
Cyperaceae genera